The Chimps of Fauna Sanctuary: A Canadian Story of Resilience and Recovery is a non-fiction book, written by Canadian writer Andrew Westoll, first published in May 2011 by HarperCollins. In the book, the author chronicles the time he spent volunteering at the Fauna Sanctuary, an animal refuge in Quebec for chimpanzees that had been used for biomedical research.

Synopsis
The Chimps of Fauna Sanctuary describes what chimpanzees endure as research subjects. Westoll explains that most were separated from their mothers at birth, injected with diseases and deadly viruses, repeatedly operated on, and frequently driven mad through isolation and social deprivation. The chimpanzees, whose life expectancy is similar to humans, had spent over a decade living in "horrific lab conditions". Speaking at the award ceremony for the 2012 "Charles Taylor Prize", Westoll said "he became attached to each of the animals", and that "the strong feelings remain". He continued by saying "this is why I write, so I can remember and experience my time with them again", concluding his speech saying: "I remember them all the time."

Awards and honours
The Chimps of Fauna Sanctuary won the Charles Taylor Prize for Literary Non-Fiction (2012), and was shortlisted for the British Columbia's National Award for Canadian Non-Fiction and the Edna Staebler Award for Creative Non-Fiction (2012). It was named a "Book of the Year" by Quill & Quire, The Globe and Mail, Amazon.ca, and CTV's Canada AM.

References

External links
Ten Ways to Help Animals in Labs, Humane Society
Chimp Portraits of the Fauna chimps by Frank Noelker

Canadian non-fiction books
2011 non-fiction books
HarperCollins books